Lethe diana, the Diana treebrown, is a brush-footed butterfly (subfamily Satyrinae) in the family Nymphalidae. Its wings are a dark shade of brown, with an eyespot pattern, and a wingspan of about 45–55 mm. It resembles Lethe confusa; however, the Lethe confusa bears a white band on its wings, setting them apart.

Description 
The Lethe diana wingspan ranges from 45 to 55 mm. Its forewings are dark brown, and sometimes have white belt-like patterns that are more apparent on the female. The hindwings are also dark brown with an eyespot pattern adorning the back, with about one or two small eyespots and on the forewings, and six eyespots ranging in size on the hindwing. The veins are a distinctly noticeable darker brown.

Range 
The Lethe diana can be found in regions of Russia such as Primorye, Sakhalin and South Kuril. Regions of Japan such as Hokkaido, Honshu, Shikoku, Kyushu and Tsushima.

Habitat 
Lethe diana can be found in deciduous forests from flatlands and mountains.

Life cycle 
The Lehte diana undergoes the four stages of complete metamorphosis:

Eggs 
Eggs are laid singularly under the surface of a blade of bamboo grass, and the larvae grows on its own.

Larval host plants 
Sasa kuriles

Adult food sources 
 Quercus acutissima – saw tooth oak
 Quercus serrata – deciduous oak tree
 Phyllostachys nigra - black bamboo
 Phyllostachys reticulata
 Pleioblastus simonii
 Pleioblastus chino
 Sasa borealis
 Sasa kurilensis - evergreen bamboo
 Sasa veitchii
 Arundinaria - cane
 Poacae
 Sasa - broadleaf bamboo

Lethe diana is also known to suck the fluids of carrion in a process known as mud-puddling.

Subspecies
Lethe diana diana
Lethe diana australis
Lethe diana sachalinensis (southern Sakhalin)
Lethe diana tomariope (Kurile Islands)
Lethe diana mikuraensis (Honshu, Japan)

References

diana
Butterflies described in 1866
Butterflies of Asia
Taxa named by Arthur Gardiner Butler